Henri Maître is an Emeritus Professor at the Télécom Paris Institut Mines-Télécom, specializing in the area of image processing and pattern recognition applications.

Biography
Prof. Maître's research advanced in the fields ranging from digital camera to computational photography. He has done extensive research in remote sensing applications. His work included studies related to troposphere effects and its multi-temporal correction in differential SAR interferometry, watermarking, feature detection of SAR images and Hough Transform applications.

Patents
Procédé et dispositif holographique en lumière incohérente permettant l'étude du relief terrestre (1989)
Appareil automatique pour la numérisation d'une surface tridimensionnelle (1981)
Appareil de détermination de l'histogramme des tailles de particules ou de globules notamment sanguins (1979)

Selected bibliography

Articles

Books

References

Living people
French National Centre for Scientific Research scientists
École Centrale de Lyon alumni
Year of birth missing (living people)
Research directors of the French National Centre for Scientific Research